Poboru is a commune in Olt County, Muntenia, Romania. It is composed of six villages: Albești, Cornățelu, Creți, Poboru, Seaca and Surpeni.

References

Communes in Olt County
Localities in Muntenia